Midgie may refer to:

 Highland midge, a species of small flying insect also known as a midgie in the Scots language
 The Midgie, a magazine aimed at independent travellers from the publishers of The List
 Midgie Purvis, a play by playwright Mary Chase